William Hubbell may refer to:

William Spring Hubbell (1801–1873), politician
William Stone Hubbell (1837–1930), U.S. Army captain
Bill Hubbell (1897–1980), baseball pitcher